Missillac (Merzhelieg in Breton) is a commune located in the department of Loire-Atlantique in western France.

Geography 

Missillac is located at the northwestern edge of Loire-Atlantique at the limit of the Morbihan 25 km from Saint-Nazaire, 65 km northwest of Nantes, and 25 km south of Redon. The communes bordering Missillac are Sévérac, Saint-Gildas-des-Bois, Sainte-Reine-de-Bretagne, La Chapelle-des-Marais, Herbignac, and Pontchâteau.

Population

Transport
The commune is crossed by the Nantes-Vannes expressway.

References

See also
La Baule - Guérande Peninsula
Communes of the Loire-Atlantique department
Parc naturel régional de Brière

Communes of Loire-Atlantique